The walking catfish (Clarias batrachus) is a species of freshwater airbreathing catfish native to Southeast Asia. It is named for its ability to "walk" and wiggle across dry land, to find food or suitable environments. While it does not truly walk as most bipeds or quadrupeds do, it has the ability to use its pectoral fins to keep it upright as it makes a wiggling motion with snakelike movements to traverse land. This fish normally lives in slow-moving and often stagnant waters in ponds, swamps, streams, and rivers, as well as in flooded rice paddies, or temporary pools that may dry up. When this happens, its "walking" skill allows the fish to move to other aquatic environments. Considerable taxonomic confusion surrounds this species and it has frequently been confused with other close relatives. One main distinction between the walking catfish and the native North American ictalurid catfish with which it sometimes is confused, is that the walking catfish lacks an adipose fin.

Characteristics and anatomy 
Often covered laterally in small white spots, the body is mainly coloured a gray or grayish brown. This catfish has long-based dorsal and anal fins, as well as several pairs of sensory barbels. The skin is scaleless, but covered with mucus, which protects the fish when it is out of water.

This fish needs to be handled carefully when fishing it due to its embedded sting or thorn-like defensive mechanism hidden behind its fins (including the middle ones before the tail fin, similar to the majority of all catfishes).

Taxonomy, distribution, and habitat 
The walking catfish is a tropical species native to Southeast Asia. The native range of true Clarias batrachus is confirmed from the Indonesian island of Java only, but three closely related and more widespread species frequently have been confused with this species. These are C. magur of northeast India and Bangladesh, a likely undescribed species from Indochina, and another likely undescribed species from the Thai-Malay Peninsula, Sumatra, and Borneo. Both of these undescribed species have been referred to as, Clarias aff. batrachus. At present, the taxonomic position of the Philippines population (called hito or simply "catfish" by the locals) is unclear, and it also is unclear whether South Indian populations are C. magur or another species. As a consequence, much information (behavioral, ecological, related to introduced populations, etc.) listed for C. batrachus, may be for the closely related species that have been confused with true C. batrachus. True C. batrachus, C. magur and the two likely undescribed species are all kept in aquaculture.

Walking catfish thrive in stagnant, frequently hypoxic waters, and often are found in muddy ponds, canals, ditches, and similar habitats. The species spends most of its time on, or right above, the bottom, with occasional trips to the surface to gulp air.

Diet 
In the wild, this creature is omnivorous; it feeds on smaller fish, molluscs, and other invertebrates, as well as detritus and aquatic weeds. It is a voracious eater that consumes food supplies rapidly, so it is considered harmful when invasive.

As an invasive species 
Within Asia, this species has been introduced widely. It has also been introduced outside its native range where it is considered an invasive species. It consumes the food supplies of native fish and preys on their young. It also is regarded as an invasive species because they can destroy fish farms.

In the United States, it is established in Florida. It is reported in California, Connecticut, Georgia, Massachusetts, and Nevada.  
The walking catfish was imported to Florida, reportedly from Thailand, in the early 1960s for the aquaculture trade. The first introductions apparently occurred in the mid-1960s when adult fish imported as brood stock escaped, either from a fish farm in northeastern Broward County or from a truck transporting brood fish between Dade and Broward Counties. Additional introductions in Florida, supposedly purposeful releases, were made by fish farmers in the Tampa Bay area, Hillsborough County in late 1967 or early 1968, after the state banned the importation and possession of walking catfish.

Aquarium releases likely are responsible for introductions in other states. Dill and Cordone (1997) reported this species has been sold by tropical fish dealers in California for some time. They also have been spotted occasionally in the Midwest.

In Florida, walking catfish are known to have invaded aquaculture farms, entering ponds where they prey on agricultural fish stocks. In response, fish farmers have had to erect fences to protect ponds. Authorities have also created laws that ban possession of walking catfish.

In 2017, Clarias spp. were recovered from the River Tonge, near Bolton, Northern England.

As food 
In Thailand, this fish is known as, pla duk dan. It is a common, inexpensive food item, prepared in a variety of ways. It often is offered by street vendors, especially grilled or fried.

This fish is one of the most common freshwater catfish in the Philippines where it is known as hito in the local language.

In Indonesia, it is called lele, and it is the main ingredient in several native dishes, such as pecel lele.

Not true C. batrachus, but C. magur  is eaten in Bangladesh and West Bengal as magur curry, and is considered good during illness, particularly for body weakness. It is prepared in a light curry sauce with coriander powder and cinnamon powder. It reportedly is fed to children to develop body strength.

In Karnataka, C. magur  is called murgodu (ಮುರ‍್ಗೋಡು). In coastal Karnataka, it is called mugudu, and is considered a delicacy. Neither the Thai nor the Indian populations are likely to be C. batrachus, however.

Aquarium 
A white variation with black patterns is commonly seen in the aquarium fish trade. However, this color variation also is prohibited where walking catfish are banned. Very well-rooted plants and large structures that provide some shade should be included in an aquarium with these fish. Any small tankmates will be eaten by this fish.

See also 
Eel catfish
List of freshwater aquarium fish species
List of invasive species in the Everglades

References

External links 

 Ros, Wolfgang (2004): "Clarias batrachus - Erfolgreiche Froschwels-Nachzucht im Aquarium", Datz 57 (7): 12–15.
 Ros, Wolfgang (2006): "Clarias batrachus - Auslösen der Fortpflanzung bei Froschwelsen", Datz 59 (4): 33–37.

Clarias
Fish of Bangladesh
Fish of Southeast Asia
Fish of Thailand
Fish described in 1758
Taxa named by Carl Linnaeus
Fish of the Philippines
Amphibious fish

pam:Itu